Porter Michael Peterson (born June 17, 1976) is an American football coach and former player. He is currently the outside linebackers coach at the University of Florida. He most recently was the outside linebackers coach at the University of South Carolina. Peterson played college football at the University of Florida, where he was a member of a national championship team and earned All-American honors. He was a second-round pick in the 1999 NFL Draft and played professionally for thirteen seasons with the Indianapolis Colts, Jacksonville Jaguars and Atlanta Falcons of the National Football League (NFL).

Early years 

Peterson was born in Gainesville, Florida in 1976.  He attended Santa Fe High School in nearby Alachua, Florida, where he played for the Santa Fe Raiders high school football team.

College career 

Peterson accepted an athletic scholarship to attend the University of Florida in Gainesville, Florida, and played for coach Steve Spurrier's Florida Gators football team from 1995 to 1998.  He was a member of the 1996 Gators team that finished 12–1 and won the Bowl Alliance national championship by defeating the top-ranked Florida State Seminoles 52–20 in the Sugar Bowl.  Peterson started twenty-four of forty-two games in which he played, posted 249 tackles, three forced fumbles, thirteen tackles for a loss and 8.5 sacks.  As a senior team captain in 1998, he was a first-team All-Southeastern Conference (SEC) selection and a first-team All-American, and was selected as the Gators' most valuable player by his teammates.

Peterson was inducted into the University of Florida Athletic Hall of Fame as a "Gator Great" in 2011.

College awards and honors
 2× SEC Championship (1995, 1996)
 Bowl Alliance National Championship (1996)
 First-team All-SEC (1998)
 First-team All-American (1998)
 University of Florida Athletic Hall of Fame

Professional career 

The Indianapolis Colts selected Peterson in the second round (36th overall) of the 1999 NFL Draft. The Colts acquired the pick from the St. Louis Rams in exchange for Marshall Faulk. 

On March 13, 2012, he became an unrestricted free agent, but re-signed with the Falcons on July 23, 2012. Peterson again became an unrestricted free agent in 2013.

NFL awards and honors
 Second-team All-Pro (2005)

Coaching career 

Upon retirement from the NFL, Peterson returned to the University of Florida in 2013 to complete his undergraduate degree. He first worked as an undergraduate assistant coach on the Gators strength and conditioning staff then took over as its coordinator in 2014 after graduating.

In 2016, Peterson was hired as outside linebackers coach on Will Muschamp's staff at South Carolina.

On January 5, 2022, Peterson was hired as outside linebackers coach on Billy Napier's staff at Florida.

Personal life 

Peterson is the older brother of former Chicago Bears running back Adrian Peterson and cousin of former NFL wide receiver Freddie Solomon.  Peterson is married to his wife Chantal and they have two sons: Mike, Jr. and Gavin.

Peterson and his wife established the Mike Peterson Foundation in 2004.  The foundation was constituted in an attempt to support and benefit under-served youth and socio-economically challenged families in Peterson's hometown of Alachua, Florida and his NFL cities of Jacksonville and Atlanta.  Since its inception, the Mike Peterson Foundation has already served over 15,000 youth and families through several community events and programs, most notably the Top Dog Readers Club literacy program at the Grove Park Elementary School in Atlanta.

See also 

 Florida Gators
 Florida Gators football, 1990–99
 List of Florida Gators football All-Americans
 List of Florida Gators in the NFL Draft
List of University of Florida Athletic Hall of Fame members

References

Bibliography 

 Carlson, Norm, University of Florida Football Vault: The History of the Florida Gators, Whitman Publishing, LLC, Atlanta, Georgia (2007).  .
 Golenbock, Peter, Go Gators!  An Oral History of Florida's Pursuit of Gridiron Glory, Legends Publishing, LLC, St. Petersburg, Florida (2002).  .
 Hairston, Jack, Tales from the Gator Swamp: A Collection of the Greatest Gator Stories Ever Told, Sports Publishing, LLC, Champaign, Illinois (2002).  .
 McCarthy, Kevin M.,  Fightin' Gators: A History of University of Florida Football, Arcadia Publishing, Mount Pleasant, South Carolina (2000).  .
 Nash, Noel, ed., The Gainesville Sun Presents The Greatest Moments in Florida Gators Football, Sports Publishing, Inc., Champaign, Illinois (1998).  .

1976 births
Living people
People from Alachua, Florida
Sportspeople from Gainesville, Florida
Players of American football from Gainesville, Florida
American football middle linebackers
Florida Gators football players
All-American college football players
Indianapolis Colts players
Jacksonville Jaguars players
Atlanta Falcons players